The New Zealand National Party's Senior Whip administers the "whipping in" system that tries to ensure that party MPs attend and vote according to the party leadership's wishes. The position is elected by the National caucus members. The Senior Whip also acts as an intermediary between the backbenchers and the party leadership. Whenever National is in government the senior whip serves as the Chief Government Whip and when out of government serves as Chief Opposition Whip.

All National whips have been members of the House of Representatives, with none coming from the Legislative Council before its abolition in 1950.

The current whips are Chris Penk (MP for Kaipara ki Mahurangi—senior whip) and Maureen Pugh (List MP—junior whip), appointed 7 December 2021.

List
The following is a list of all senior whips of the National Party:

See also
Senior Whip of the Labour Party
Senior Whip of the Liberal Party

References

Bibliography

New Zealand National Party
Political whips